Events from the year 1940 in Scotland.

Incumbents

 Secretary of State for Scotland and Keeper of the Great Seal –  John Colville until 10 May; vacant until 14 May; then Ernest Brown

Law officers
 Lord Advocate – Thomas Mackay Cooper
 Solicitor General for Scotland – James Reid

Judiciary
 Lord President of the Court of Session and Lord Justice General – Lord Normand
 Lord Justice Clerk – Lord Aitchison
 Chairman of the Scottish Land Court – Lord Murray

Events
 1 January – the Marriage (Scotland) Act 1939 outlawed "irregular" marriages ("marriage by declaration" or "handfasting") from this date, ending the practice of "anvil marriage" at Gretna Green.
 17 January – World War II:  sank SS Polzella and the neutral Norwegian ship Enid 10 miles north of Shetland.
 9 February – World War II: A German aircraft was forced down on North Berwick Law.
 3–9 March –  made her maiden voyage on delivery from Clydebank to New York.
 11 March – World War II: Scotland north and west of the Great Glen and Inverness became a restricted area.
 16 March – World War II: First civilian casualty of bombing in the UK, on Orkney.
 30 April –  was sunk by accidental explosion off Greenock.
 May – construction of Churchill Barriers on Orkney began.
 9 May – Guy Lloyd won the East Renfrewshire by-election for the Unionist Party.
 29 May – World War II: Requisitioned Clyde steamers Queen-Empress, Duchess of Fife, Oriole (called Eagle on the Clyde), Marmion and Waverley took part in the Dunkirk evacuation; Waverley was lost.
 12 June – World War II: More than 10,000 soldiers of the 51st (Highland) Division under General Victor Fortune surrendered to General Erwin Rommel at Saint-Valery-en-Caux.
 24 June–1 July – World War II: Operation Fish – Royal Navy cruiser  sails from Greenock in convoy to Halifax, Nova Scotia, carrying a large part of the gold reserves of the United Kingdom and securities for safe keeping in Canada. Another convoy sets sail on 5 July from the Clyde, including HMS Batory, carrying cargo worth $1.7 billion, the largest movement of wealth in history.
 1 July – World War II: First Luftwaffe daylight bombing raid on mainland Britain at Bank Row, Wick: 15 civilians, 8 of them children, killed.
 19 July – World War II: First Luftwaffe daylight raid on Glasgow; little damage was caused.
 20 July – World War II: A Luftwaffe bomb largely destroyed the stand at King's Park F.C.'s Forthbank Park in Stirling, leading to the demise of the club.
 16 September – World War II: British liner SS Aska was bombed by a German aircraft south of Gigha whilst carrying French troops from Gambia; 12 crew died but 75 survivors were picked up by trawlers.
 November – World War II: Building of No. 1 Military Port at Faslane on the Gare Loch and No. 2 Military Port at Cairnryan began. Garelochhead Training Camp is also established this year.
 Kilquhanity School near Castle Douglas was founded by John Aitkenhead.

Births
 6 January – John Byrne, playwright and artist
 11 January – Sydney Devine, singer (died 2021)
 18 January – Lindsay L. Cooper, jazz string player (died 2001) 
 24 February – Denis Law, international footballer
 28 February – Jim Baikie, comics artist (died 2017)
 2 March – Billy McNeill, Celtic footballer and manager (died 2019)
 3 March – Patricia Gage, actress (died 2010 in Canada)
 15 March – Jack Whyte, historical novelist (died 2021 in Canada)
 19 April – Dougal Haston, mountaineer (killed 1977 in the Swiss Alps)
 14 May
 Chay Blyth, yachtsman and adventurer
 Sir George Ross Mathewson, businessman
 23 May – Giles Gordon, author and agent (died 2003)
 8 June - Stanley Robertson, folk singer, ballad singer and piper (died 2009)
 23 June
 Derry Irvine, Baron Irvine of Lairg, Lord Chancellor
 Stuart Sutcliffe, pop musician and artist (died 1962 in Hamburg)
 28 June – Roderick Wright, Bishop of Argyll and the Isles (Catholic) (died 2005 in New Zealand)
 29 June – Bill Napier, astronomer and science fiction author
 1 July – Craig Brown, footballer and Scotland national football team manager
 10 July – Tom Farmer, entrepreneur
 28 July – Brigit Forsyth, actress
 4 August – Robin Harper, Green politician
 20 August – Gus Macdonald, television journalist and Labour politician
 3 November – Charlie Gallagher, footballer (died 2021)
 4 November – Sally Baldwin, social sciences professor (died 2003 in Italy)
 24 November – Donald Macleod, theologian
 1 December – Mike Denness, international cricketer (died 2013)
 William Barr, Arctic historian
 Peter Kerr, travel writer

Deaths 
 11 February – John Buchan, 1st Baron Tweedsmuir, novelist, historian and Unionist politician (born 1875; died in Canada)
 15 June – George Washington Browne, architect (born 1853)
 18 June – Sir George Andreas Berry, ophthalmologist and Unionist politician (born 1853)
 19 November – James Cromar Watt, artist, architect and jeweller (born 1862)
 16 December – William Wallace, classical composer and ophthalmologist (born 1860; died in England)
 Dugald Campbell, doctor from the Isle of Arran, set up the national health service in Hawaii during the 1890s

The arts
 Publication of The Golden Treasury of Scottish Poetry edited by Hugh MacDiarmid.

See also 
 Timeline of Scottish history
 1940 in Northern Ireland

References 

 
Years of the 20th century in Scotland
Scotland
1940s in Scotland